Kalateh-ye Mirza Jani (also Romanized as Kalāteh-ye Mīrzā Jānī; also known as Kalāteh-ye Mīrzā Jān, Kalāteh Mīrzā Jān, Kalāteh-ye Khān Mīrzā Khān, Kalāteh-ye Mirājān, Kalāteh-ye Mīrzā Khān, Kalāt-i-Mirza Jān, Mīrzā Khānī, and Qalāt-i-Mirza Jān) is a village in Pain Velayat Rural District, Razaviyeh District, Mashhad County, Razavi Khorasan Province, Iran. At the 2006 census, its population was 728, in 145 families.

References 

Populated places in Mashhad County